Mr Bones is a comedy film.

Mr Bones may also refer to:

 Mr. Bones (video game)
 Mr Bones (Judge Dredd)
 Mister Bones, a DC Comics character
 Mister Bones (Star Wars), a Star Wars droid character
 Jamie Spaniolo (born 1975), aka Mr. Bones, American rapper
 Mr Bones, a minstrel show character
 Barnum Brown, paleontologist whose popular nickname was "Mr. Bones"

See also
 Bones (disambiguation)